The VESA Digital Flat Panel (DFP) interface standard specifies a video connector and digital TMDS signaling for flat-panel displays. It features 20 pins and uses the PanelLink protocol; the standard is based on the preceding VESA Plug and Display (P&D) standard, ratified in 1997. Unlike the later, electrically-compatible Digital Visual Interface (DVI, 1999), DFP never achieved widespread implementation.

History
P&D combined analog and digital video with data over USB and FireWire to reduce cable clutter, but the feature creep resulted in an unpopular, expensive connector. Compaq described DFP as a "transition" step between the analog VGA connector and P&D: DFP was designed by a consortium including Compaq, Hewlett Packard, and ATI Technologies as a smaller, simpler connector, dropping support for analog video and data in favor of transmitting exclusively digital video signals.

The connector was used by displays such as the Compaq Presario FP400, FP500, FP700, Fp720, 5204, and 5280. It was offered on graphics cards such as the Xpert LCD, and Rage LT Pro by ATI Technologies, and the Oxygen GVX1 by 3Dlabs.

Design
DFP is compatible electrically with P&D (and by extension, DVI); DFP uses the Display Data Channel (DDC) standard level DDC2B for operation and the Extended Display Identification Data (EDID) protocol to identify the display to the host. Like the preceding P&D, DFP uses the PanelLink TMDS protocol developed by Silicon Image for digital video signals.

The DFP standard specifies a 20-pin mini D ribbon connector; however, as the signal protocols are identical, DFP connectors generally are compatible with devices equipped with a DVI interface by using a passive adaptor.

All DFP-compliant devices are required to support resolutions of 640×400, 720×400, and 640×480 (each at a refresh rate of 60Hz) as a minimum level of interoperability, although the resulting display may not necessarily be centered or scaled.

DFP was superseded by DVI because DFP, like P&D, is limited to a single-link TMDS signal. In contrast, DVI is capable of higher maximum resolutions because it supports a dual-link TMDS signal; in addition, DVI also supports analog video, which makes the VGA connector redundant.

References

External links 
 DFP diagram and description of pin layout
 DFP is mentioned in ATI's description of the Xpert LCD  

Digital flat panel